Cyrus Goodman is a fictional main character in the American family comedy-drama television series Andi Mack on Disney Channel. The character is portrayed by Joshua Rush and first appeared on television in the pilot episode, "Tomorrow Starts Today". Cyrus is the best friend of both Andi Mack and Buffy Driscoll, the title character and a fellow main character, respectively, and attends Jefferson Middle School alongside them. The series has been nominated for and won awards specifically for Cyrus and his coming out storyline, the introduction of which caused a ratings surge.

Conception and casting 
Andi Mack creator and executive producer Terri Minsky has stated in an interview with the Academy of Television Arts & Sciences that the character of Cyrus was inspired by her daughter's friends, most of whom are gay and realized that about themselves when they were middle school students:

In August 2016, Andi Mack, created by Lizzie McGuire creator Terri Minsky, was picked up by Disney Channel, with then 14-year-old actor Joshua Rush, the voice of Bunga on the Disney Junior series The Lion Guard, cast as the then 12-year-old Cyrus Goodman.

In March 2017, The New York Times reported on the character in an article about the then-upcoming Disney Channel series prior to its premiere in April 2017.

Actor Joshua Rush, who portrays Cyrus, has stated in interviews with Good Morning America and Us Weekly that he considers it an "honor" for him to be portraying the character, that he is "proud" to portray Cyrus, and that the character is relatable to him because one of his best friends had come out to him first:

Disney has stated that it consulted with child development experts as well as Common Sense Media, GLAAD, and PFLAG to develop the character and his coming out storyline.

Character 
Cyrus Goodman is the best friend of both Andi Mack and Buffy Driscoll, the title character and a fellow main character, respectively. Along with his friends, he lives in Shadyside in the fictional U.S. state of Midwest and starts the series as a seventh grade student at Jefferson Middle School. The first gay main character on American Disney Channel, Cyrus has come out to Andi, Buffy, and their mutual friend Jonah. Cyrus is Jewish and has celebrated his bar mitzvah, the second depiction of that coming of age ceremony after Lizzie McGuire on Disney Channel.

Cyrus was previously in a relationship with Iris, a girl who Amber and Jonah set him together with, but, while he enjoyed her company because of their shared interests and similar personalities, Cyrus eventually admitted that he had no romantic feelings for her; they amicably broke up and agreed to just be friends. Cyrus previously had a long-term crush on Jonah, which he revealed to Buffy and Andi, but his crush on him later fades away. Cyrus grows close to TJ, the captain of the Jefferson Middle School boys' basketball team, after they bond over their shared personal issues. The two develop feelings for each other and in the series finale, these feelings are made apparent and they hold hands, marking the start of a romantic relationship.

Cyrus enjoys writing screenplays in his free time and playing board games with his friends. His favorite foods are chocolate chip muffins and baby taters.

Legacy

Critical reception 
The character has drawn considerable media attention and Disney's announcement of his coming out was widely reported in the news, both nationally and internationally: BBC News, The Washington Post, ABC News, People, Us Weekly, TVLine, HuffPost, and NPR all described it as "history", while The Hollywood Reporter, Entertainment Weekly, IndieWire, Fortune, the New York Daily News, and the Los Angeles Times all described it as "groundbreaking".

Vogue, E! News, and The Salt Lake Tribune have critiqued the inclusion of the character and his coming out storyline as follows:

LGBTQ rights organizations, including GLAAD, PFLAG, and Stonewall, all lauded Disney's inclusion of a character that "reflects the lives and lived experiences" of LGBT youth. Pride commented that the romantic moment between Cyrus and TJ in the series finale is "both the first and the last we get from the Disney Channel’s first real queer relationship between two main characters. It’s an appropriately gentle moment for a show that’s handled its gay character and his storylines in such a relatable human manner. And while fans are sad this is the last moment of Cyrus and TJ...it was certainly an important one."

Awards and achievements 
Cyrus Goodman is the first gay main character and the first character to have uttered the phrase "I'm gay" on Disney Channel.

Andi Mack won the 2018 GLAAD Media Award for Outstanding Kids & Family Programming and the 2018 Academy of Television Arts & Sciences award for Television with a Conscience, specifically for Cyrus Goodman and his coming out storyline.

The introduction of the character's coming out storyline caused the series to experience a ratings surge.

Censorship and controversy 
Andi Mack was censored in Kenya by the Kenya Film Classification Board, criticized by the One Million Moms division of the American Family Association, and voluntarily axed by Disney from air throughout the Middle East and Africa on account of "cultural sensibilities" because of the character and his coming out storyline.

See also 
 Howard and Harold McBride of The Loud House, the first married gay couple on Nickelodeon
 Good Luck Charlie, the first Disney Channel series to feature a married gay couple
 The Legend of Korra, the first Nickelodeon animated series to feature LGBT characters
 Doc McStuffins, the first Disney Junior animated series to feature a married gay couple

Notes

References 

2017 in LGBT history
Child characters in television
Fictional American Jews
Television characters introduced in 2017
Fictional gay males
Fictional LGBT characters in television
American male characters in television
Teenage characters in television